The Duke Steps Out is a 1929 American silent comedy-drama film directed by James Cruze and starring William Haines and Joan Crawford. The film is lost, but the Vitaphone sound discs track of music and sound effects survive in the UCLA Film and Television Archive.

Plot
Duke (Haines) a pampered millionaire's son, who longs to be a boxer, takes an interest in Susie (Crawford), a college coed, after he defends her from being bullied. Duke's interest in Susie leads him to enroll in the same school as Susie. After a misunderstanding between Duke and Susie, they realize they are meant to be together and are reunited.

Cast
William Haines as Duke
Joan Crawford as Susie
Karl Dane as Barney, Duke's Chauffeur
Tenen Holtz as Jake, Duke's Manager
Edward Nugent as Tommy Wells
Jack Roper as Poison Kerrigan
Delmer Daves as Bossy Edwards
Luke Cosgrave as Professor Widdicomb
Herbert Prior as Mr. Corbin
Gwen Lee (uncredited)
Harold Lockwood (uncredited)
Gertrude Messinger (uncredited)
Marie Messinger (uncredited)

Box office
According to MGM records the film earned $714,000 in the US and Canada and $206,000 elsewhere, resulting in a profit of $343,000.

References

External links

1929 films
American silent feature films
American black-and-white films
Metro-Goldwyn-Mayer films
1920s English-language films
1929 comedy-drama films
Lost American films
Films directed by James Cruze
1929 lost films
1920s American films
Silent American comedy-drama films